{{Automatic taxobox
| taxon = Euthema
| fossil_range =Albian-early Cenomanian
| image = Euthema hesoana holotype Fig4.jpg
| image_caption = Holotype specimen of Euthema hesoana
| authority = Yu, Wang & Pan, 2018
| subdivision_ranks = Species
| subdivision = See text
| synonyms = * Paleodiplommatina 
 Xenostoma 
| display_parents = 3
}}Euthema is a fossil genus of minute land snails with an operculum, terrestrial gastropod molluscs in the family Diplommatinidae from the Cretaceous Burmese and Hkamti ambers.

Species
As of 2021, 8 species are placed into Euthema:E. annae :MolluscaBase - Euthema annae described from the Cretaceous Burmese amber, the species was first described in the paper published online by "Cretaceous Research" on October 16th 2020, which qualifies as a nomenclatural act under Article 8.5 of the ICZN when registered in ZooBank, though the final version of the paper was published and printed in February 2021.E. dilatata , originally described as Truncatellina dilatatusE. hesoana E. lophopleura , originally described in the new genus XenostomaE. myanmarica  - species from Hkamti amberZooBank - Euthema myanmaricaE. naggsi , type speciesE. spelomphalos , originally described in the new genus PaleodiplommatinaE. truncatellina MolluscaBase - Euthema truncatellina

EtymologyEuthema truncatellina is named after the extant genus Truncatellina (Stylommatophora), which has a similar shell, acknowledging the convergence in the different lineages of gastropods on land.

DescriptionEuthema annae has a shell which is almost cylindrical with 6 weakly convex whorls, ribbed, with strong constriction. Aperture almost heart-shaped with parietal inclusion. Umbilicus narrow. Periumbilical keel weak. The aperture is oval and the umbilicus wide, with a strong periumbilical keel. The aperture is circular, the umbilicus narrow, and the periumbilical keel is absent.

References

Links
MolluscaBase - Euthema

Diplommatinidae
Burmese amber
Prehistoric gastropod genera